Trachelocyphus is a genus of beetles in the family Carabidae, containing the following species:

 Trachelocyphus aenigmaticus Tschitscherine, 1900
 Trachelocyphus gerardianus (Burgeon, 1935)
 Trachelocyphus mirulus (Tschitscherine, 1901)
 Trachelocyphus trisulcis (Chaudoir, 1878)
 Trachelocyphus tschitscherini Lutshnik, 1922

References

Pterostichinae